Campus Universidad del Salvador is an architectural project created by Clorindo Testa for the Universidad del Salvador in Pilar, Buenos Aires. It comprises an auditorium and a library. The auditorium has capacity for 600 people and was designed not only for academic functions but for other types of cultural uses. It is designed in the shape of a large mound in the manner of an ancient Egyptian tomb.

References

External links
 Images of the Buildings of Clorindo Testa
 Images of the Campus Universidad del Salvador

Pilar, Buenos Aires
Salvador
2002 establishments in Argentina